Equal Times was an American feminist newspaper published in Boston, Chicago from 1976 until 1984. Also known as "Boston's newsweekly for women" and "Boston's Newspaper for Working Women," Equal Times primarily wrote on matters relating to equal pay and jobs for women.

The newspaper has been criticized for their content and for only catering toward upper-class and middle-class white women. They have also been compared to other feminist periodicals such as Sojourner and Majority Report.

References 

Publications established in 1976